Virgin EMI Records was a British record label owned by the Universal Music Group that was formed in 2013. In June 2020, the label was rebranded as EMI Records, and operates Virgin Records as an imprint of the new EMI Records.

History 
Virgin EMI Records was founded in March 2013 through the merger of Mercury Records UK and Virgin Records. It operated two distinct A&R and marketing streams—Virgin and EMI Records. Virgin EMI became one of Universal Music UK's front-line labels, alongside Polydor Records, Island Records, Decca Records, and a newly established Capitol Records UK. Mercury Records UK, which traditionally released International Island and Def Jam artists in the UK will now operate as an imprint under Virgin EMI along with Universal Island, which also released Republic Records artists in that country The new label will replace Mercury and Virgin as the releasing label in the UK, for Def Jam and Island US's international roster as well as Virgin Records America artists.

On 16 June 2020, Universal rebranded Virgin EMI Records as EMI Records and named Rebecca Allen (former president of UMG's Decca label) as the label's president, and will continue to operate Virgin Records as an imprint of EMI Records.

Artists 

Virgin EMI's artists include Carrie Underwood, Taylor Swift, Florence and the Machine, Lewis Capaldi, Katy Perry, Emeli Sande, The Chemical Brothers, Jamiroquai, The Libertines, Fall Out Boy, Lorde, Chase & Status, Metallica, Avicii, Elton John, Tion Wayne, Chvrches, Paul McCartney, Bastille, Blossoms, Loyle Carner, Martin Solveig, Bon Jovi, Harris J, The Vamps, George Michael, Devo, The Stone Roses, HRVY, Vic Mensa, Massive Attack, Avenged Sevenfold, Paul Simon, Krept and Konan, Amy Macdonald, Duke Dumont, Kanye West, Westlife, Konirata and Four of Diamonds. Furthermore, Mike Oldfield, whose Tubular Bells album launched the original Virgin Records, is also a Virgin EMI artist.

References

External links
 
 Virgin 40 official website
 Discography

Companies based in the London Borough of Camden
Record labels established in 2013
Record labels disestablished in 2020
British record labels
English record labels
Rock record labels
Pop record labels
Contemporary R&B record labels
IFPI members
Labels distributed by Universal Music Group
2013 establishments in England
2020 disestablishments in England
Virgin Records
EMI